The Black Reel Award for Television for Outstanding Writing, Drama Series is an annual award given in honor of a writer or writers who produced an outstanding story or screenplay for an episode of a television drama series during the primetime network season episode of the year.

2010s

2020s

Programs with multiple awards

4 awards
 This Is Us

Programs with multiple nominations

7 nominations 
 This Is Us

4 nominations
 Queen Sugar

2 nominations
 Pose

Total awards by network
 NBC – 4
 Netflix - 1

Individuals with multiple awards

2 wins
 Eboni Freeman 
 Kay Oyegun

Individuals with multiple nominations

3 nominations 
 Kay Oyegun 

2 nominations 
 Ava DuVernay
 Eboni Freeman 
 Janet Mock
 Ryan Murphy

References

Black Reel Awards